Donley County is a county located in the U.S. state of Texas. As of the 2020 census, its population was 3,258. Its county seat is Clarendon. The county was created in 1876 and later organized in 1882.

History
Donley County was established in 1876 from land given by the Bexar District. It is named for Stockton P. Donley, justice of the state supreme court.

Several historical sites are listed on the National Register of Historic Places in Donley County.

Geography

Major highways
  Interstate 40
  U.S. Highway 287
  State Highway 70
  State Highway 273

Adjacent counties
 Gray County (north)
 Wheeler County (northeast)
 Collingsworth County (east)
 Hall County (south)
 Briscoe County (southwest)
 Armstrong County (west)
 Carson County (northwest)

Demographics

Note: the US Census treats Hispanic/Latino as an ethnic category. This table excludes Latinos from the racial categories and assigns them to a separate category. Hispanics/Latinos can be of any race.

As of the census of 2000, 3,828 people, 1,578 households, and 1,057 families resided in the county. The population density was four people per square mile (2/km2). The 2,378 housing units averaged 3 per square mile (1/km2). The racial makeup of the county was 91.41% White, 3.94% Black or African American, 0.89% Native American, 0.10% Asian, 2.72% from other races, and 0.94% from two or more races. About 6.35% of the population was Hispanic or Latino of any race.

Of the 1,578 households, 24.80% had children under the age of 18 living with them, 56.70% were married couples living together, 7.50% had a female householder with no husband present, and 33.00% were not families. About 31.40% of all households were made up of individuals, and 17.00% had someone living alone who was 65 years of age or older. The average household size was 2.30 and the average family size was 2.86.

In the county, the population was distributed as 22.40% under the age of 18, 9.80% from 18 to 24, 20.60% from 25 to 44, 25.50% from 45 to 64, and 21.70% who were 65 years of age or older. The median age was 43 years. For every 100 females, there were 94.40 males. For every 100 females age 18 and over, there were 91.70 males.

The median income for a household in the county was $29,006, and for a family was $37,287. Males had a median income of $24,375 versus $18,882 for females. The per capita income for the county was $15,958. About 10.50% of families and 15.90% of the population were below the poverty line, including 20.90% of those under age 18 and 15.90% of those age 65 or over.

Culture
The Harold Dow Bugbee Ranch, formerly owned by the Western artist and his second wife, Olive Vandruff Bugbee, also an artist, is located in Donley County.

U.S. Highway 287, which runs through the county, has a modern rest area. The rest area also offers sanctuary from weather offering a tornado shelter in the main building.

Communities

Cities
 Clarendon (county seat)
 Hedley
 Howardwick

Unincorporated community
 Lelia Lake

Notable residents

 U.S. Representative Mac Thornberry

Politics

See also

 List of museums in the Texas Panhandle

 Recorded Texas Historic Landmarks in Donley County

References

External links
 Donley County in Handbook of Texas Online at the University of Texas
 Donley County
 Donley County Profile from the Texas Association of Counties 

 
1882 establishments in Texas
Populated places established in 1882
Texas Panhandle